Po Leung Kuk Tang Yuk Tien College was opened on 1 September 1987. It is the 8th English College of Po Leung Kuk.

The principal of the college is Cheung Ka Pong. The vice-principals are Mr. Chan Kai Sing and Mr. Tang Sang Keung. And the assistant principals are Ms. Daisy Chui Yau Ying and Mr. Ryan Lau.

Dr Darnay Chan was one of the College's headmasters, most notable being the founding headmaster of PLK Vicwood KT Chong Sixth Form College.

Student organizations

Prefect Team
Prefect Team helps with the daily job of disciplinary committee. There are 3 head prefects from form 5, 8 senior prefects and about 50 prefects.

BBS Scheme
Big Brothers and Sisters Scheme(BBS)helps form 1 students to be familiar with their school. In the charity fun fair each year, it takes part of snack kiosk. There are 2 BBS Senior Leaders, 4 BBS Leaders and about 25 BBSs. Senior Leaders. Leaders are form 5 students while BBSs are students from Form 3 and 4.

Students Union

 "藝萃閣" (97-98)
 I do (06-07)
 JUST (07-08)
 M&M (08-09)
 Y-Not? (09-10)
 Cash (10-11)
 Flamingo (11-12)
 Popcorn (12-13)
 Lollipop (13-14)
 Sparkle (14-15)
 Phoenix (15-16)
 Flarion (16-17)
 Pixel (17-18)
 Palette (18-19)
 Zenith (19-20)
 Herald (20-21)
 Griffin (21-22)

English Society
It holds 10 English Speaking Day in each academic year. The society also send student representatives the join 'The Battle of Books' competition and drama improvisation competition held by the Education Bureau.

Mathematic Society
It holds different activities each year, including Sudoku competition and mathematics olympiad competition for form 2 students.

Robot Club
It was established in 2007. It holds different activities every year to let students know more about robots, computers and technology. It even let students join inter-school competitions. Most of the activities are open to the whole school. The club is located in the Design and Technology room.

Every year, it holds a lot of workshops to let students to learn about and make robots. The join the Charity fun fair in 2008 and 2010. Also, it held an exhibition and "Robot Cup" competition for form 1 in 2007–2008. The members joined RoboCup, WRO and other inter-school competitions within these years

Members usually use Lego Mindstorms NXT(now EV3) and KMK SE-R2 Robot Kit. They also use Joinmax Super RCU and VEX Lego Mindstorms RCX etc.

References

Secondary schools in Hong Kong
Po Leung Kuk